NA-12 Kohistan-cum-Lower Kohistan-cum-Kolai Palas Kohistan is a constituency for the National Assembly of Pakistan. It covers the whole of districts of Kohistan, Lower Kohistan, and Kolai-Palas. The constituency was formerly known as NA-23 (Kohistan) from 1977 to 2018. The name changed to NA-11 (Kohistan) after the delimitation in 2018 and to NA-12 (Kohistan-cum-Lower Kohistan-cum-Kolai Palas Kohistan) after the delimitation in 2022.

Members of Parliament

1977–2002: NA-23 Kohistan

2002–2018: NA-23 Kohistan

2018-2022: NA-11 Kohistan-cum-Lower Kohistan-cum-Kolai Palas Kohistan

Elections since 2002

2002 general election

A total of 1,012 votes were rejected.

2008 general election

A total of 3,386 votes were rejected.

2013 general election

A total of 1,022 votes were rejected.

2018 general election 

General elections were held on 25 July 2018.

†Change from combined vote of JUI-F, and MDM in 2013

See also
NA-11 Shangla
NA-13 Battagram

References

External links 
Election result's official website

11
11